Carl Johan Grimmark (born  October 14, 1977
) is a Swedish guitarist. He has appeared with several influential Christian metal bands including Narnia, Saviour Machine, and Rob Rock. He recently joined the band Beautiful Sin in 2006, he has also played with Jerusalem on some occasions including Sweden rock in 2015.  He also has been a special guest guitarist on fellow Narnia bandmate Christian Liljegren's side projects Divinefire and Audiovision.  He recently recorded his debut solo album that is set to be titled Grimmark, where he also handles the lead vocals. Grimmark's style of playing, especially on Narnia's earlier work, is often compared to the neo-classical metal stylings of Yngwie Malmsteen, or under a more broad genre, neo-classicism.

Grimmark is the main composer in Narnia, and on their album The Great Fall most of the lyrics were written by him. On their other albums the lyrics have been written by their vocalist Christian Liljegren. Grimmark is also given credits as a producer on several of Narnia's albums.

Grimmark has become a highly acclaimed guitarist in the Christian hard rock music genre as more people are exposed to his solid technical abilities, which can be exemplified by the fact that he is credited for playing every instrument on Narnia's first album, Awakening, and his unique approach towards incorporating a neo-classical sound into his music.

Discography

German Pascual
 The New Beginning (2012)

Fullforce
 One (2011)

Narnia
 Awakening (1998)
 Long Live the King (1999)
 Desert Land (2001)
 The Great Fall (2003) (Not released in Japan)
 At Short Notice... Live in Germany (2006)
 Enter the Gate (2006)
 Decade of Confession (2007)
 Course of a Generation (2009)
 Narnia (2016)
 From Darkness to Light (2019)

Saviour Machine
 Legend Part III:I (2001)
 Live in Deutschland (2002)
 Rarities/Revelations (2006)
 Legend Part III:II (TBA)

Various
 Guitar Odyssey: Tribute to Yngwie Malmsteen (2001)
 Return to Fantasy: A Tribute to Uriah Heep (2003)

Sanctifica
 Negative B (2002)

Rob Rock
 Eyes of Eternity (2003)
 Holy Hell (2005)
 Garden of Chaos (2007)
 The Voice of Melodic Metal - Live in Atlanta (2009)

Locomotive Breath
 Train of Events (2003)

System Breakdown
 102 (2003)

Divinefire
 Glory Thy Name (2004)
 Hero (2005)
 Into a New Dimension (2006)
 Eye of the Storm (2011)

Audiovision
 The Calling (2005)

Flagship
 Maiden Voyage (2005)

Planet Alliance
 Planet Alliance (2006)

Deep Effect
 Deep Effect

Grimmark
 Grimmark (2007)
Solo effort by guitar phenom Carl Johan Grimmark, best known for his work with melodic metal band Narnia. Grimmark handles vocals himself on this outing.

Empire 21

 Empire 21 (2014)

Members:

Ricard Hulteke: Vocals
 
CJ Grimmark: Guitars & Key's

Andreas Ålöv: Bass

John Svensson: Keyboard

Tobias Enbert: Drums

Genre: Melodic Rock/Metal

Origin: Jönköping, Huskvarna, Gothenburg & Borås, Sweden

http://www.empire21.se/

References
 Narnia
 Yngwie Malmsteen

External links
 Carl Johan Grimmark's official website

See also
 List of rock instrumentals
 Neo-classical metal
 Shred guitar

Swedish Christians
Christian metal musicians
Swedish heavy metal guitarists
Narnia (band) members
Living people
1977 births
21st-century guitarists